Theologis Papadopoulos (born 12 January 1960) is a Greek former professional footballer who played as a goalkeeper.

Club career
Papadopoulos started football in 1974 from the amateur team Eleftheriakos Eleftherion, while he became more widely known competing in the AEL from 1979. In 1984, he moved to AEK Athens, where after a few seasons became the main goalkeeper of the club. During his tenure at AEK, he also became an international. In 1988, even though he was a key player in the team for years, his career at AEK suddenly came to an end. On the eve of the cup rematch against Olympiacos, former AEK footballer Dinos Ballis visited the AEK team's hotel, offered a bouquet to Papadopoulos and was eventually suspected of attempted bribery. The match took place, Olympiacos won 1–3 and Papadopoulos had a very bad performance. The continuation was given to the courts, even after Papadopoulos finally reported that there was indeed an attempted bribery. The owners of Olympiacos, the Koskotas brothers and Dinos Balis, as an intermediary, were accused of attempting to bribe the AEK players, Papadopoulos and Vasilakos. Finally, in an incredible court decision, everyone was acquitted, except Ballis.

After all this, Papadopoulos left in a bad way from AEK and went to Panionios. He played for the club of Nea Smyrni until 1992 and eventually ended his career in 1993 at Ionikos.

International career
Papadopoulos appeared in 24 matches for the Greece from 1986 to 1992.

References

1960 births
Living people
Footballers from Larissa
Greek footballers
Greece international footballers
AEK Athens F.C. players
Athlitiki Enosi Larissa F.C. players
Panionios F.C. players
Association football goalkeepers